MSC Camille is one of the largest container ships in the world.

Hull and engine
The MSC Camille was built by Daewoo Shipbuilding & Marine Engineering Co in yard number 4136. It is a fully cellular container ship. It can hold up to 14,000 Twenty-foot equivalent units, which makes it one of the biggest container ships in the world. The ship is 365.52m in length and has a 51m beam. MSC Camille as a total output of 98,218 hp. It is also equipped with two tunnel thrusters for better maneuverability in and out of ports.

Illegal goods
A January 2010 inspection of MSC Camille found 1.5 tonnes of illegally imported goods from China to Teesport. Some of them were from animal origin (about 200 boxes), noodles, milk, sweets, and other food. All the items were destroyed.

Vessel collision
On June 20, 2010, Torm Marina (110,000 DWT) was struck by the container ship MSC Camille, 48 miles east of Gibraltar. MSC Camille struck the Torm Marina in the bow, cracking the hull from deck to keel. At time of the collision the Torm Marina had no cargo and no oil stored in effected tanks, avoiding a potential disaster in the Strait of Gibraltar.  No injuries were reported.

References

External links
Video: MSC Camille

Container ships
2009 ships
Ships built by Daewoo Shipbuilding & Marine Engineering